Percival or Percival Schuttenbach is a Polish folk metal band from Lubin, formed by musicians due to their fascination with history and historical reenactment in 1999. The name "Percival" refers not to any historical figure, but to the gnome named Percival Schuttenbach from Andrzej Sapkowski's The Witcher series of novels. The leaders of the band are Mikołaj Rybacki and Katarzyna Bromirska. They became known for their song Lazare which was used as soundtrack song for The Witcher 3: Wild Hunt video game.

Music 
The band plays traditional songs of Europe, mostly Slavic, and its own compositions referring to Early Medieval times, such as the Vikings era and pagan Europe.
Musicians play traditional instruments: long-necked lute (saz or Bağlama), byzantine lyra (rebec), drums, and flutes.
Percival presents its music during historical events in Poland (e.g. the biggest Viking and Slavic festival in Poland on Wolin island), as well as abroad in Germany, France, Czech Republic, Lithuania,  Slovakia, Belgium, Isle of Man and Scandinavia.

In 2010, the musicians began cooperation with music producer Donatan. Project "Equinox" combines traditional Slavic sounds with hip-hop music. They ended their relations in 2013, over a financial dispute.

One of Percival's songs, inspired by the game The Witcher 3: Wild Hunt, for which they also wrote music, was added to an e-book, Sezon Burz, by Andrzej Sapkowski.

Albums 
Eiforr - CD - 2007
Oj Dido - CD - 2008
Słowiański Mit o Stworzeniu Świata (Slavonic Myth of Creation) - CD - 2009 
Slava! Pieśni Słowian Południowych (Slava! Songs of the South Slavs) - CD - 2012
Slava! Pieśni Słowian Wschodnich (Slava! Songs of the East Slavs) - CD - 2014
Slava! Pieśni Słowian Zachodnich (Slava! Songs of the West Slavs) - CD - 2018

Awards 
 "Virtual Fiddle" plebiscite – for the best folk record of the year 2007- "Eiforr” - the 6th place 
 "Virtual Fiddle" plebiscite - for the best folk record of the year 2008 - "Oj Dido” - the 4th place 
 "Virtual Fiddle" plebiscite - for the best folk record of the year 2009 - "Slowianski Mit o Stworzeniu Swiata” - the 5th place 
 "Virtual Fiddle" plebiscite - for the best folk record of the year 2012 - "Slava!” - the 4th place 
 "Virtual Fiddle" plebiscite - "Slava!” - the best cover project by Zuzanna Chanska

References

External links 

 

Polish folk groups
2005 establishments in Poland
Musical groups established in 2005